Mușetești is a commune in Gorj County, Oltenia, Romania. It is composed of seven villages: Arșeni, Bârcaciu, Gămani, Grui, Mușetești, Stăncești and Stăncești-Larga.

References

Communes in Gorj County
Localities in Oltenia